Mekha Lal Shrestha is a Nepali politician of Nepali Congress and Minister in Gandaki government since 23 July 2021. He is also serving as member of the Gandaki Province Provincial Assembly. Shrestha was elected to the 2017 provincial assembly elections from the proportional list. He joined Krishna Chandra Nepali cabinet as  Minister for Education, Culture, Science, Technology and Social Development on 23 July 2021.

Reference 

21st-century Nepalese politicians
Nepali Congress politicians from Gandaki Province

Year of birth missing (living people)
Living people